The 2012–13 Deportivo de La Coruña season was the 82nd season in club history.

Current squad 
The numbers are established according to the official website: www.canaldeportivo.com

As of 1 February 2013

Out on loan

Competitions

Legend

La Liga

League table

Matches

Copa del Rey

Round of 32

Sources

Deportivo de La Coruna
Deportivo de La Coruña seasons